The Northrop BT was an American two-seat, single-engine monoplane dive bomber built by the Northrop Corporation for the United States Navy. At the time, Northrop was a subsidiary of the Douglas Aircraft Company. While unsuccessful in its own right, the BT was subsequently redesigned into the Douglas SBD Dauntless, which would form the backbone of the Navy's dive bomber force.

Design and development
The design of the initial version began in 1935. It was powered by a  Pratt and Whitney XR-1535-66 double row air-cooled radial engine and had hydraulically actuated perforated split flaps (dive brakes), and main landing gear that retracted backwards into fairing "trousers" beneath the wings. The perforated flaps were invented to eliminate tail buffeting during diving maneuvers.

The next iteration of the BT, the XBT-1, was equipped with a  R-1535. This aircraft was followed in 1936 by the BT-1, powered by an  R-1535-94 engine. One BT-1 was modified with a fixed tricycle landing gear and was the first such aircraft to land on an aircraft carrier.

The final variant, the XBT-2, was a BT-1 modified to incorporate landing gear which folded laterally into recessed wheel wells, leading edge slots, a redesigned canopy, and was powered by an  Wright XR-1820-32 radial. The XBT-2 first flew on 25 April 1938, and after successful testing the Navy placed an order for 144 aircraft. In 1939 the aircraft designation was changed to the Douglas SBD-1 with the last 87 on order completed as SBD-2s. By this point, Northrop had become the El Segundo division of Douglas aircraft, hence the change.

Operational history

The U.S. Navy placed an order for 54 BT-1s in 1936 with the aircraft entering service during 1938. The type was not a success in service due to poor handling characteristics, especially at low speeds, "a fatal flaw in a carrier based aircraft." It was also prone to unexpected rolls and a number of aircraft were lost in crashes.

Variants
XBT-1
Prototype, one built.
BT-1
Production variant, 54 built.
BT-1S A BT-1 (c/n346, BuNo 0643) was fitted with a fixed tri-cycle undercarriage. This aircraft was damaged in a crash on 6 February 1939, returned to Douglas and repaired to BT-1 standard.

XBT-2 
One BT-1 modified with fully retractable landing gear and other modifications.
BT-2
Production variant of the XBT-2, 144 on order completed as SBD-1 and SBD-2.
Douglas DB-19
One BT-1 (c/n346, BuNo 0643), the former BT-1S, was modified as the DB-19 which was tested by the Imperial Japanese Navy as the Douglas DXD1 (long designation - Douglas Navy Experimental Type D Attack Aircraft)

Operators

 United States Navy

Specifications (BT-1)

Notable mentions in media
Northrop BT-1s appeared in pre-war yellow wing paint schemes in the Technicolor film Dive Bomber (1941) starring Errol Flynn.

See also

References
Notes

Bibliography

 Bowers, Peter M. United States Navy Aircraft since 1911. Annapolis, MD: Naval Institute Press, 1990, .
 Brazelton, David. The Douglas SBD Dauntless, Aircraft in Profile 196. Leatherhead, Surrey, UK: Profile Publications Ltd., 1967. No ISBN.
 Drendel, Lou. U.S. Navy Carrier Bombers of World War II. Carrollton, TX: Squadron/Signal Publications, Inc., 1987. .
 Gunston, Bill. The Illustrated History of McDonnell Douglas Aircraft: From Cloudster to Boeing. London: Osprey Publishing, 1999. .
 Kinzey, Bert. SBD Dauntless in Detail & Scale, D&S Vol.48. Carrollton, TX: Squadron/Signal Publications, Inc., 1996. .
 Listemann, Phil. Northrop BT-1 (Allied Wings No.3). France: www.raf-in-combat.com, 2008. .
 Swanborough, Gordon and Peter M. Bowers. United States Navy Aircraft since 1911. London: Putnam, Second edition, 1976. .

External links

 VectorSite: The Douglas SBD Dauntless & Curtiss SB2C Helldiver
 Northrop BT-1
 Image of a DB-19

B01T
Northrop BT1
Single-engined tractor aircraft
Low-wing aircraft
Carrier-based aircraft
Aircraft first flown in 1935
World War II dive bombers of the United States